Fatah is a Palestinian nationalist political party, and the largest faction of the confederated multi-party Palestine Liberation Organization. It may also refer to:

As a given name 

 Fatah (name)

Political organizations
Fatah al-Intifada, a Palestinian militant faction
Fatah Alliance, an Iraqi political coalition
Fatah Halab, a joint-operations room of rebel factions operating in the Syrian Civil War
Fatah Hawks, a Palestinian militant-group duo
Fatah Special Operations Group, a Palestinian militant faction
Fatah al-Islam, a Palestinian Islamist militant group

Places 

 Fatah Kandi, a village in West Azerbaijan Province, Iran

Other
 Al-Fatah, an Iraqi short-range ballistic missile
 Al-Fatah, an Egyptian women's magazine

See also
 Fattah (disambiguation)
 Fateh (disambiguation)